Sclerophrys is a genus of "true toads", family Bufonidae, native to Africa and the southern Arabian Peninsula. Originally, all of these species were classified in the genus Bufo. The genus, originally named Amietophrynus, was split due to large enough taxonomic divergence. Ohler and Dubois showed in 2016 that Sclerophrys capensis Tschudi, 1838 is the same species as Bufo regularis rangeri Hewitt, 1935, the type species of Amietophrynus. Because the former name is older, the implication is that Amietophrynus is a junior synonym of Sclerophrys.

Species
The following species are recognized in the genus Sclerophrys.

References

 
Amphibian genera
Amphibians of Africa
Amphibians of Asia
Taxa named by Johann Jakob von Tschudi